Sundaram is a Bengali theatre group, established in 1957. They have staged more than 40 productions like Fingerprint, Char Dewalergolpo, Parabas, Sajano Bagan, and Alokanandar Putra Kanya.

Bengali stage and film director Partha Pratim Chowdhury started the group. It was later carried on by writer and actor Manoj Mitra.

Productions

Alokanandar Putra Kanya
Finger-Print
Galpo Hekim Saheb
Ja Nei Bharatey. 
Kancha
Mesh-O-Rakshash
Mrityur Chokhe Jal.
Parabas 
Sajano Bagan
Shovajatra

Awards
Alokanandar Putra Kanya won Siromani Purashkar presented by Asian Paints. Lead actress of this play also was awarded the Best Actress Award by the West Bengal State Natya Academy in the year 1990.
Galpo Hekim Saheb also won Siromani Purashkar from Asian Paints in 1995.

References

Theatre in Kolkata
Organisations based in Kolkata
Theatre companies in India
Bengali theatre groups
1957 establishments in West Bengal
Arts organizations established in 1957